Ritu Pathak (born 4 September 1987) is a Bollywood playback singer. Born in Gopalganj, India, she rose to fame after participating in second season of Indian Idol. She was one of the finalists in another TV music talent show, Fame X. She has recorded numerous songs with many prominent composers, such as Shankar–Ehsaan–Loy, Sajid–Wajid and Anand Raj Anand.

Early life
Pathak was born in a village in Gopalganj, Seoni Madhya Pradesh. Her father was a singer who performed at local orchestras and small gatherings. She was encouraged by him to pursue a career in music and he used to take her to participate in reality singing shows. She got her first vocal lessons in Nagpur and she received Hindustani classical vocal training from Sangit Mahabharti.

Career 
Pathak participated in singing talent show Fame X on the suggestion of Sonia Rao, who was a judge on the show. She gained recognition from her performance in the show; and afterwards met Anand Raj Anand and began singing scratches for presentations.

In 2010, Pathak met Shankar–Ehsaan–Loy who selected her to sing the Papa Jag Jaayega, for the film Housefull. After that, she worked with composer Pritam Chakraborty to sing the song Razia Gundo Mein Phans Gayi from film Thank You and other songs from Hello Darling and Action Replayy. She went on to work with Anand Raj Anand to sing Jalebi Bai for the filmDouble Dhamaal, which is one of her most popular songs to date.

Pathak has also worked with Sajid–Wajid in many songs, such as Radha Nachegi in Tevar.

Pathak has sung playback for the actress Sonakshi Sinha on many occasions, such as in the song Gandi Baat from R. Rajkumar.

Pathak has also sung Lip to Lip (from Katti Batti), DJ Bajega To Pappu Nachega (from Kis Kisko Pyaar Karoon) Cinema Dekhe Mamma (from Singh Is Bliing). Having worked with so many composers, she wishes to sing for the maestro A. R. Rahman one day.

In 2012, Pathak hosted the show ‘Retrospective Special’ which was broadcast on DD1 which features interesting trivia about movies from the golden era. She has performed in live shows in numerous events in Delhi, Mumbai, Bengaluru, Raipur, Udaipur and  other major Indian cities. She has also performed in Poland, Muscat, Rangoon, Kathmandu and Malaysia and China. She toured to Australia & Fiji Island with Johnny Lever, Priyanka Chopra & Abhijeet Sawant. In 2007, she did a show in Israel with Johnny Lever.

Pathak was nominated in the Stardust Awards in 2012 for the category New Musical Sensation - Female for the song Jalebi Bai in the film Double Dhamaal).

Discography

Bollywood

Other languages

Albums

Non-film songs

References

External links

1987 births
Living people
Filmi singers
Indian women pop singers
Bollywood playback singers
Indian women playback singers
21st-century Indian singers
Singers from Madhya Pradesh
Actresses from Madhya Pradesh
Indian women classical singers
Indian women singer-songwriters
Indian singer-songwriters
21st-century Indian women singers
Women musicians from Madhya Pradesh